Chokka Thangam is a 2003 Indian Tamil-language drama film written and directed by K. Bhagyaraj and produced by G. Venkateswaran under the banner GV Films. It stars Vijayakanth, Soundarya, and Uma with Goundamani, Senthil, Prakash Raj, and Swathi playing supporting roles. The background score and music was composed by Deva. The film was released on 15 January 2003 and became commercially successful. The film also marked actress Soundarya in her last Tamil film to date.

Plot
Muthu lives in a village with his sister Maragatham. Muthu is very fond of his sister and ready to do anything for her. Pavazham is an orphan who lives in the same village. Muthu and Pavazham have a liking towards each other. Periya Minor is the local baddie who tries to molest Pavazham when she is alone. However, Muthu comes for rescue and takes Pavazham along with him to his house.

Maragatham is married to Sundaram. Sundaram's sister Gowri's wedding is also arranged. But on the day of Gowri's wedding, her fiancé passes away which makes the villagers believe that Gowri is unlucky. Sundaram's family members want Muthu to marry Gowri, but Muthu refuses as he is in love with Pavazham. Angered by this, Sundaram's family members kick out Maragatham from their house as a means of revenge. Maragatham comes back to Muthu's house.

Muthu tries hard to get Gowri's wedding fixed again, but in vain. He meets Akash with a wedding proposal, but is turned down by his parents. Meanwhile, Maragatham is conceived. Sundaram understands Muthu's situation and visits Maragatham frequently without informing his family members. Finally, Sundaram finds a bride groom for Gowri and their wedding is arranged. Sundaram also brings Maragatham to his house and the families are united.

One day, Akash and his family members are about to meet with an accident, however Muthu spots them and saves them. Akash's family members understand the good nature of Muthu despite them humiliating him when he came with a marriage proposal with Gowri. On the day of Gowri's marriage, it is revealed that the groom is a cheat and is set by Ponnambalam with plans of trapping Muthu. Ponnambalam wants Muthu to give him Pavazham, so that Gowri's wedding will go as planned. Else, he threatens that the wedding will be cancelled which might hurt Gowri again.

Muthu fights Ponnambalam and decides to sacrifice his love. Muthu agrees to marry Gowri as he does not want Gowri to be disappointed again by cancelling her wedding. However, Akash's family members, now agree to get Akash married to Gowri. Akash and Gowri are married. Finally, Muthu and Pavazham are also married.

Cast

Vijayakanth as Muthu
Soundarya as Pavazham
Uma as Maragatham
Goundamani as Muthu's uncle
Senthil as Servant
Prakash Raj as Sundaram
Swathi as Gowri
C. R. Saraswathi as Sundaram's cousin
Sindhu as Sundaram's cousin
Jaya Murali as Sundaram's mother
S. S. Chandran as Sundaram's uncle
Vinu Chakravarthy as Temple trustee
Thyagu as Sindhu's husband
T. P. Gajendran as C. R. Saraswathi's husband
Ponnambalam as Periya Minor
Besant Ravi as Chinna Minor
B. V. Balaguru as Villager
Sriman as Muthu's friend
Akash as Muthu's friend
Lekhasri as Sundari
Usha Priya as Sundari's mother
Pasi Sathya as Muthu's aunt
Nellai Siva as Village Nattamai
Chelladurai as Villager
Kovai Senthil as Villager
Idichapuli Selvaraj as Villager
Tirupur Ramasamy as Villager
Soundar as Abusing husband
Kalidoss as Police inspector
Mippu as Villager
Lollu Sabha Soundarya as Mentally challenged woman

Production
Soon after GV Films announced their collaboration with Vijayakanth, the producers approached Cheran to direct the film. However, due to issues concerning remuneration, K. Bhagyaraj eventually took on the role. Vidhya Venkatesh was originally approached for the role of Vijayakanth's sister since she was busy with Kalaatpadai, she could not spare her dates and she was replaced by Uma.

Soundtrack
The soundtrack was composed by Deva and lyrics were written by R. V. Udayakumar, P. Vijay, Thamarai, and Snehan.

Critical reception
Balaji of Thiraipadam noted "The movie is not much different from other movies where Vijayakanth stars as the village do-gooder and has all the usual ingredients found in his movies like a squeaky clean image for him, duets in bright costumes and a bunch of fights" and also wrote "Bagyaraj's trademarks of a humorous screenplay, sprinklings of double entendre dialogs and a close look at marital issues are all but absent". Malathi Rangarajan of The Hindu wrote "The film does have its plus points, yet somehow Bhagyaraj's magic touch in films [..] is definitely missing in 'Chokka Thangam.'"

References

External links
 in The Hindu

2003 films
2000s Tamil-language films
Films scored by Deva (composer)
Films directed by K. Bhagyaraj